Gary Lee Miller is a professor of Computer Science at Carnegie Mellon University, Pittsburgh, United States. In 2003 he won the  ACM Paris Kanellakis Award (with three others) for the Miller–Rabin primality test. He was made an ACM Fellow in 2002 and won the Knuth Prize in 2013.

Early life and career 
Miller received his Ph.D. from the University of California, Berkeley in 1975 under the direction of Manuel Blum. Following periods on the faculty at the University of Waterloo, the University of Rochester, MIT and the University of Southern California, Miller moved to Carnegie Mellon University, where he is now Professor of Computer Science. In addition to his influential thesis on computational number theory and primality testing, Miller has worked on many central topics in computer science, including graph isomorphism, parallel algorithms, computational geometry and scientific computing. His most recent focus on scientific computing led to breakthrough results with students Ioannis Koutis and Richard Peng in 2010 that currently provide the fastest algorithms—in theory and practice—for solving "symmetric diagonally dominant" linear systems, which have important applications in image processing, network algorithms, engineering and physical simulations. His Ph.D. thesis was titled Riemann's Hypothesis and Tests for Primality.

References

External links
Gary Miller's web page at Carnegie Mellon.
Gary Miller at the Mathematics Genealogy Project.
 Miller's original paper "Riemann's Hypothesis and Tests for Primality"

Carnegie Mellon University faculty
Living people
American computer scientists
Theoretical computer scientists
UC Berkeley College of Engineering alumni
Knuth Prize laureates
Year of birth missing (living people)